Bendik Bye (born 9 March 1990) is a Norwegian football player currently playing as a striker for 1. divisjon club  Ranheim.

After impressive performances for Steinkjer, Bye signed a contract with Ranheim in 2011. After four seasons in Ranheim Bye went to Levanger in 2015.

After just two seasons with Levanger, Bye signed a contract with Eliteserien side Sogndal 3 November 2016. He made his debut in the season opener in April 2017.

Career statistics

Club

References

1990 births
Living people
People from Steinkjer
Norwegian footballers
Steinkjer FK players
Ranheim Fotball players
Levanger FK players
Sogndal Fotball players
Kristiansund BK players
Norwegian First Division players
Eliteserien players
Association football forwards
Sportspeople from Trøndelag